The Liga Nacional de Futsal (LNF) is the premier futsal league in Brazil, and was created in 1996 with the purpose of setting up a championship with the best futsal teams of the country, corresponding to the Brazilian Football Championship Série A. It is organized by the Brazilian Futsal Confederation (CBFS).

The Championship

History
The league was created in 1996, with the aim to improve the most important Brazilian clubs and help the growth of the sport in the country. The league was inspired by the American basketball league (NBA). On April 27, 1996, the Liga Futsal started.

Franchise system
To be eligible to participate in the league, there are three options available: buy a franchise, be appointed by a company which owns a franchise, or be invited by the league. It is necessary to send a proposal to the Liga Futsal, which will analyze and decide if the team's participation will be accepted, in a general assembly involving all the franchise representatives. Currently, a franchise is worth R$ 300,000.00.

Prize money
In 2007 the total prize money was R$ 75,000.00. The winner, besides being awarded R$ 50,000.00 (the runner-up was awarded R$ 25,000.00), won a scudetto, created by the CBFS and represented Brazil in two international competitions (South American Club Futsal Championship and Intercontinental Futsal Cup). The competition organizers also reserved R$ 1,237 million to cover expenses such as transportation, accommodation, food provision and referee taxes for the clubs which participated at least two times in the competition.

Clubs
The following 22 clubs are competing in the Liga Futsal during the 2022 season.

Winners

Records and statistics

By team

By state

Top scorers 

Notes

External links
 Official website
 Confederação Brasileira de Futsal

  
Futsal competitions in Brazil
Futsal
Brazil
1996 establishments in Brazil
Sports leagues established in 1996
Professional sports leagues in Brazil